Carmen Brusca (born 7 November 1985) is an Argentine futsal player and a former footballer who played as a defender.

She was a member of the Argentina women's national football team. She was part of the team at the 2007 FIFA Women's World Cup. On club level she played for Boca Juniors in Argentina.

References

1985 births
Living people
Place of birth missing (living people)
Argentine women's futsal players
Argentine women's footballers
Women's association football defenders
Argentina women's international footballers
2007 FIFA Women's World Cup players
Footballers at the 2015 Pan American Games
Pan American Games competitors for Argentina